True Album Akina 95 Best is a compilation album by Japanese entertainer Akina Nakamori, released through MCA Victor on December 6, 1995. Produced by Nakamori, the album consists of her singles from the MCA Victor era and self-covers of her singles from the Warner Pioneer era. The album is split in three discs: "Wild Disc" focuses on Nakamori's fast-paced songs, "World Disc" features songs with world music themes, and "Whisper Disc" compiles her ballads.

Charting performance
The album peaked at No. 16 on Oricon's weekly albums chart and charted for seven weeks. It sold over 86,000 copies.

Track listing

Charts

References

External links
 
 

1995 compilation albums
Akina Nakamori compilation albums
Japanese-language compilation albums
Self-covers albums
MCA Records compilation albums
Universal Music Japan compilation albums